Andrena miserabilis, the smooth-faced miner bee is a species of miner bee in the family Andrenidae. It is found in Central America and North America.

References

miserabilis
Insects described in 1872
Articles created by Qbugbot